Jorge Pescara (born 14 January 1966) is a Brazilian bassist and Megatar player specializing in jazz fusion, progressive rock, experimental music, and Brazilian jazz.

Setup

 Basses: D'Alegria Defender Jorge Pescara signature 5str bass; Condor BC8000JP (prototype) fretless 8str;
 Touchguitars: Megatar Toneweaver 12str; Megatar Dragon 12str (NST tuning); Paschalis touch 12str (Stick tenor tuning)
 Strings: Elixir Nanoweb to Bass (.030, .045, .065, .085, .105, .130); plus super light to Megatar (009, 011, 016, 024, 032, 042)
 Amp: StudioR Z900 power amp
 Effects: Line6 FM4; BassWorks preamp bass modeler; Zoom G2.1U; Boss RC2; GR33 Roland Midi to synth; JP signature Bass Compressor by Rock It!; Triton Envelope Filter (Ed's Mod Shop); Moby Dick Bass Fuzz (Ed's Mod Shp); Danelectro Fab Echo; Behringer Ultra Octaver; Boss Compressor CS3; Boss Compressor CS2
 Miscellaneous: Hot Hands by Source Audio, Hi EBow; Funk Fingers; Dunlop (plectros & picks); violin bow; Roland EV5 pedal

Selected discography

Contributions

 Leila (Correndo Perigo) Mix House / Eldorado 1995
 Geisan Varne (Caldeirao de Arruda) Seven Gates records 1996
 Renato Grinberg (Caetano Sem Palavras) Camerati discos 1996
 Mello Jr. (Plugged) Indie 1997
 Laura Finocchiaro (Eco Glitter) Dabliu / Eldorado 1997
 Jadir de Castro (Ziriguidum... e Deus Criou o Samba!) Jazz Station records 1998
 Flor de Lis (Flordelis) Gospel Music 1998
 Celso Fonseca (Out of the Blues "single") Geleia Geral 1998
 Edu Helou (Ser) H. Music 1999
 Fabio Pestana (Faces) SETO ES 2000
 Street Angels (A Benefit Album...) Mr. Bongo UK / Jazz Station records 2000
 Dom Um Romao (Lake of Perseverance) Jazz Station records / IRMA Italy 2001
 Compilation (Gradation Transition) IRMA Italy 2001
 JSR All Stars (Friends From Brazil 2001) Jazz Station records / IRMA Italy 2001
 Pingarilho (Stories & Dreams) Jazz Station records 2002
 Dom Um Romao (Nu Jazz Meets Brazil) Jazz Station records / IRMA Italy 2002
 Brazil All Stars (Rio Strut) Jazz Station Records / Milestone records 2002
 Compilation (A Day in Rimini) Jazz Station Records / IRMA Italy 2002
 Chill Out Wear (Chill Out Wear) IRMA Italy 2002
 Cool Jazzy cuts with Brazilian flavour (Sister Bossa vol 3) IRMA Italy 2002
 Dom Um Romao (Groovystation EP) IRMA Italy 2003
 Ithamara Koorax (Someday the Ballad album) King records / JSR 2003
 Ithamara Koorax (Love Dance the Ballad album) Milestone records / Fantasy 2003
 Lord K (Com Ropa) K & Rivero Produções 2003
 Cool Jazzy cuts with Brazilian Flavour (Sister Bossa vol 4) IRMA Italy 2003
 Various Artists (Chill Out Cafe vol 9) IRMA Italy 2004
 Luiz Bertoni (Constante Movimento EP) Giraffe Dying records 2005
 Various Artists (Brazilia the Very Best of the New Brazilia Sound) IRMA Italy 2005
 Ithamara Koorax (The Best Of Ithamara Koorax) JSR / EMI 2006
 Ithamara Koorax (O Vento) IRMA Italy 2006
 Zero (Quinto Elemento) C&C Celebration 2007
 Compilation (Bajista) Bajista Magazine 2007
 Ithamara Koorax (Brazilian Butterfly) IRMA Italy 2007
 Mobius Megatar (TouchStyle Cd) Megatar cd 2007
 Elixir strings (Brazilian Great Music vol II) Elixir Brazilian's endorsees cd 2007
 Ithamara Koorax (Brasil Canta com Ithamara Koorax) Cedem 2008
 Sallaberry (Sambatuque) Tum Tum Home Music 2009
 Ithamara Koorax & Mamoru Morishita  Singer & Songer records 2011
 Sallaberry (New Bossa) Tum Tum Home Music 2011
 Paulo Moura (Paulo Moura & André Sachs - Fruto Maduro) Biscoito Fino 2012
 Ithamara Koorax (Got \to Be Real) IRMA records 2012
 Sallaberry (Rhythmist) Tum Tum Home Music 2013
 Dialeto (The Last Tribe) Moonjune, 2013
 LinhAmarela (Sol de Refletor) Nowa Music 2014

Solo
 Grooves in the Temple (2005)
 Knight Without Armour (2012)
 Grooves in the Eden (2018)

Books
Pescara is the author of several bass instructional books.
 Arthur Maia Transcriptions (by MPO 1995)
 Curso TKT de Contrabaixo Elétrico (by TKT editora 1999)
 Contrabaixo Completo para Iniciantes (by Irmãos Vitale editora 2004) 
 O Dicionário Brasileiro de Contrabaixo Elétrico (by editora H. Sheldon 2005)
 Coleção Toque de Mestre - Harmônicos (by HMP editora 2006)
 Contrabaixo Completo – Manual do Groove (by Irmãos Vitale editora 2008)

Videos
 O Contrabaixo Completo (by MPO video 1994)

References

External links

1966 births
Living people
Brazilian bass guitarists
Male bass guitarists
Brazilian double-bassists
Male double-bassists
Brazilian rock musicians
Jazz bass guitarists
Brazilian music educators
Brazilian songwriters
21st-century double-bassists
21st-century male musicians
Male jazz musicians